Britta Vestergaard (born 22 May 1975) is a Danish breaststroke, medley and freestyle swimmer. She competed at the 1992 Summer Olympics and the 1996 Summer Olympics.

References

External links
 

1975 births
Living people
Danish female breaststroke swimmers
Danish female freestyle swimmers
Danish female medley swimmers
Olympic swimmers of Denmark
Swimmers at the 1992 Summer Olympics
Swimmers at the 1996 Summer Olympics